Courtney Keight (born 27 December 1997) is a Welsh Rugby Union player who plays wing for the Wales women's national rugby union team and Bristol Bears. She made her debut for the Wales national squad in 2019 and represented them at the 2021 Women's Six Nations Championship.

Club career 
Keight began playing rugby relatively late compared to her counterparts, first picking up the ball in 2016 while studying at Swansea University. After playing centre for Swansea University RFC, Keight then joined Pontarddulais RFC, and later, Swansea RFC.

She signed with her current team, Bristol Bears, as winger in July 2020.

International career 
Keight caught the eye of talent scouts during a cup final for Swansea at the Principality Stadium in April 2019, and was subsequently asked to play sevens for Wales. After a brief period playing for the Ospreys, Keight was then invited to train with the Wales autumn squad, and made her international debut on the wing in a match against Ireland during the 2019 Autumn Internationals.

Keight was part of the 2020 Women's Six Nations squad, and made her first start for the team in 2021. She has earned four caps in her rugby career to date.

Personal life 
Keight attended Ysgol Greenhill School as a child, before commencing undergraduate study at Swansea University.

References

External links 

 

1997 births
Living people
Bristol Bears Women players
Welsh female rugby union players
Rugby union players from Oxford
Alumni of Swansea University
Wales international rugby union players